S. S. Kumaran is an Indian music composer and director. He made his debut as composer with Poo. He also directed two films Theneer Viduthi (2011) and Kerala Nattilam Pengaludane (2014).

Early life and career
Kumaran belong to the Valliyur village in Thirunelveli district. His childhood ambition is to become a music director. Since his dad was a headmaster, his parents were not in approval for his aspirations in cinema. They had a negative approach towards cinema. He convinced his dad and joined the Film institute to pursue his dreams to become a music director. He finished his course in Photography. He composed 3 songs and showed it to director Sasi who was impressed and provided him opportunity to compose for his film Poo. The film received critical acclaim while his music was praised, all the songs were received well especially "Choo Choo Maari".

Filmography

 As an actor 
Aval Peyar Thamizharasi (2010)
Yathumaagi (2010)
Ayyanar (2010)

References

Tamil film score composers
Tamil film directors
Living people
Year of birth missing (living people)
People from Tirunelveli district
Film directors from Tamil Nadu